Ivan Gudelj (born 21 September 1960) is a Croatian retired football midfielder who represented Yugoslavia. A full international, his career was cut short at age 25 after collapsing during a match against Red Star Belgrade. It turned out to be a hepatitis infection.

Club career
Zmijavci-bred Gudelj started his player career in a club from the neighbouring village of Runovići — NK Mračaj. There, he was coached by Marinko Boban, the father of future football star Zvonimir Boban. A few years later, Gudelj went to play for Hajduk Split, for which he played 362 games in total, scoring 93 goals, in the 1976-1986 period. He quickly marked himself out as a dependable and elegant defensive midfielder, earning the moniker "Beckenbauer from Zmijavci" in the Yugoslav press.

The rising career of a new European football star ended suddenly. Gudelj was forced to end his career cause of health problems, more specifically, hepatitis B. The twenty-six-year-old played his last game against Red Star Belgrade in Split on 23 September 1986 at the start of the 1986-87 league season. His precontract with Girondins de Bordeaux has never been realized.

International career

Youth
In 1979, eighteen-year-old Gudelj had a busy summer.

First, in June 1979, he played for Yugoslavia at the UEFA European Under-18 Football Championship in Vienna, leading his country to the championship trophy, beating Bulgaria in the final. Gudelj got named the tournament's best player.

Later that summer in August 1979, Gudelj made the Yugoslavia squad that participated at the FIFA World Youth Championship held in Japan. Playing in a tough group featuring Argentina with 18-year-old Diego Maradona, Yugoslavia failed to progress to the next stage.

Full squad
Gudelj's excellent outings for the national youth team drew the attention national team head coach Miljan Miljanić who called Gudelj up for the full squad the following year.

He made his senior debut for Yugoslavia in a September 1980 World Cup qualification match away against Luxembourg, coming on as a 85th-minute substitute for Zoran Vujović, and Gudelj quickly became Miljanić's favourite who soon made him the national team captain at the age of 21. In the end, Gudelj made 33 national team appearances, scoring three goals. He was a participant in the 1982 FIFA World Cup and Euro 1984. Because of his excellent games, French magazine L’Équipe put him on their list of ideal team of 1982 World Cup. His final international was a May 1986 friendly match away against Belgium.

He was also named the Yugoslav Footballer of the Year in 1982.

Managerial career 
He began his coaching career in 1990. As a coach, he led Croatian priests' national team and Croatian cadets national team. With the latter, he won the bronze medal in the Eurochamps 2001 in England (generation of Niko Kranjčar).

Later, he led various clubs. He made it with Primorac from Stobreč, bringing it to Croatian top league. He also led Uskok from Klis, Zadar, Dubrovnik, Austrian club Vorwärts Steyr and Hajduk (replacing Miroslav Blažević in 2005). Before taking charge at Hajduk, Gudelj was manager of the Croatia U17 National Team and successfully led them to a 4th-place finish in the 2005 UEFA European Under-17 Football Championship in Italy.

Personal life 
Born in the town of Imotski, he grew up in the nearby village of Zmijavci. As a child, Ivan Gudelj thought about becoming a priest.

Also during childhood, he was an extra in the TV series Prosjaci i sinovi, made after the novel of Ivan Raos and filmed in Gudelj's home village Zmijavci. He was distinguishing from other kids in the escape scene, because Ivan Gudelj was - the fastest.

Honours

Player
Hajduk Split 
Yugoslav Cup: 1983–84

References

External links
 

Radio-Imotski Ivane sretno!!! 
Article in Slobodna Dalmacija Nogometni univerzalac 
Imotski portal  Memorijal Ante Bruno Bušić u Vinjanima 
Serbian national football team website 

1960 births
Living people
Sportspeople from Imotski
Association football midfielders
Yugoslav footballers
Yugoslavia international footballers
Yugoslavia under-21 international footballers
Olympic footballers of Yugoslavia
Footballers at the 1980 Summer Olympics
1982 FIFA World Cup players
UEFA Euro 1984 players
HNK Hajduk Split players
Yugoslav First League players
Croatian football managers
NK Zadar managers
NK GOŠK Dubrovnik managers
SK Vorwärts Steyr managers
HNK Hajduk Split managers
Croatia national under-19 football team managers
Croatian expatriate football managers
Expatriate football managers in Austria
Croatian expatriate sportspeople in Austria